Fred Lecklider (9 June 1895, in Toledo, Ohio – 10 January 1964, in Los Angeles, California) was an American racecar driver. Lecklider made six AAA Championship Car starts in 1926 and 1927 including the Indianapolis 500 both of those years. His best finish was sixth on a pair of board ovals in 1927. He returned to Indianapolis in 1930 to drive in relief for Leslie Allen.

Indy 500 results

References

1895 births
1964 deaths
Indianapolis 500 drivers
Racing drivers from Ohio
Sportspeople from Toledo, Ohio